The Greatest Filmography 1999-2006 is a collection of Gackt's music videos released on DVD, on August 23, 2006 by Nippon Crown, and in United States and Canada on October 9, 2007 by Viz Pictures. It was released in two editions, "Red", themed around rock oriented videos, and "Blue", themed around ballad oriented videos. The version released in North America contains English subtitles.

Gackt in an interview with Shojo Beat magazine said that for him the visually most beautiful music video is of "Saikai (Story)". The video for "Another World" was filmed in Hong Kong, and it was filmed like they were shooting a movie, for which took days to do. For the video of "Redemption" they had a problem with original schedule, so had to film it all night long in a ruined warehouse. Most of Gackt's music videos were filmed in Japan, but some were also shot in locations in United States (Nevada, California), Australia, and Germany.

Track listing

References

External links
 The Greatest Filmography at Viz Pictures
 The DVDs at New People store

Gackt video albums
2006 video albums